Charles Bennet, 2nd Earl of Tankerville, KT  (21 December 1697 – 14 March 1753), styled Lord Ossulston between 1714 and 1722, was a British peer and politician.

Background
Tankerville was the son of Charles Bennet, 1st Earl of Tankerville, and Lady Mary, daughter of Ford Grey, 1st Earl of Tankerville. He was given the courtesy title Lord Ossulston when his father was created Earl of Tankerville in 1714.

Political career
Tankerville succeeded his father in the earldom in 1722 and was appointed a Knight of the Thistle in 1730. He served as Captain of the Yeomen of the Guard under Sir Robert Walpole between 1733 and 1737. From 1740 to 1753 he was also Lord Lieutenant of Northumberland.

Family
He married Camilla Colville c 1715. She served as a Lady of the Bedchamber to Queen Caroline and afterwards to the Princess Augusta. 

Lord Tankerville died in March 1753, aged 56, and was succeeded in the earldom by his elder son Charles.

References

1697 births
1753 deaths
Earls in the Peerage of Great Britain
Knights of the Thistle
Lord-Lieutenants of Northumberland
Masters of the Buckhounds